The 33rd Norwegian Biathlon Championships were held in Steinkjer, Nord-Trøndelag, Norway from 10 January to 13 January 1991 at the stadium Steinkjer skistadion, arranged by Steinkjer SK. There were 6 scheduled competitions: individual, sprint, and relay races for men and women. The team races for men and women were held on 24 March, concurrently with the final races of the Norwegian Biathlon Cup (Norgescupen), in Orkdal, at the stadium Knyken Skisenter, arranged by Orkdal IL.

In the men's relay, Rolf Storsveen came out of retirement to race for the team from Hedmark, winning bronze.

Schedule
All times are local (UTC+1).

Medal winners

Men

Women

References

Norwegian Biathlon Championships
1991 in biathlon
1991 in Norwegian sport
January 1991 sports events in Europe
Steinkjer